Ivana "Ivy" Jenkins (née Vujić) (born June 15, 1983), known is a Serbian-born Canadian bassist. She played bass for the nu-metal band Kittie from October 2007 until March 2012. She began her career with Kittie by initially filling in for ailing bassist Trish Doan in late 2007, a period which found the band playing concerts in Central and South America. Before she was in Kittie, Ivy played bass for the melodic hard rock band In The Wake from Toronto, Canada. In 2008, it was officially announced that Ivy was a full-time member of Kittie and in 2009 she appeared on their fifth studio CD, In The Black. Ivy also wrote and recorded bass for Kittie's sixth album, I've Failed You, which was released on August 15, 2011. Jenkins plays a black Warwick Corvette 5 string bass guitar.

Ivy is the co-owner of Umeus Cloth, a clothing line run by herself and Geoffrey Jenkins, the former vocalist of Gwen Stacy. On April 2, 2011 Ivy Vujic married Jenkins.

Ivy is currently playing bass guitar in a metal band called Speedgod, from Lansing, MI with her husband Geoff Jenkins on vocals. In June 2013 they released a 3 song compilation dubbed "the Summer 2013 Demos"  which is available for free download on their official website.

References

External links 
 kittierocks.com
 www.warwickbass.com
 https://soundcloud.com/ivyvujic/sets/in-the-wake-1

Canadian people of Serbian descent
Women bass guitarists
Canadian heavy metal bass guitarists
1983 births
Living people
Musicians from Belgrade
Serbian emigrants to Canada
21st-century Canadian women musicians
21st-century Canadian bass guitarists
Kittie members